Bobby Lockwood is an English actor. He is known for his roles as Mick Campbell in House of Anubis and as Rhydian Morris in Wolfblood. In 2021, he appeared in the BBC medical drama series Casualty as Leon Cook.

Career 
In 2006, when he was twelve, Lockwood appeared in the BBC school drama series Waterloo Road. In 2012, he was cast as Mick Campbell in Nickelodeon's House of Anubis. He later left the programme during the second series to star in the CBBC series Wolfblood; for which he won a British Academy Children's Award for Best Performer in 2013. That same year, Lockwood hosted the BAFTA Children's Awards Showcase with Shannon Flynn. In 2014, Lockwood won the BBC athletics series Tumble. In January 2021, Lockwood joined the cast of the BBC medical drama series Casualty as paramedic Leon Cook. He left the series in May of that year.

Filmography

Film

Television

Stage

Awards and nominations

External links

References

Living people
21st-century English male actors
English male film actors
English male television actors
Male actors from Essex
People from Basildon
Year of birth missing (living people)